The Magic Johnson Foundation was founded by basketball legend Magic Johnson in 1991, the same year Johnson temporarily retired from the NBA, and works to develop programs and support community-based organizations that address the educational, health and social needs of ethnically diverse and urban communities. The foundation has three strategic priorities: HIV/AIDS, Scholarship, & Community Empowerment Centers. Currently, it serves more than 250,000 individuals each year through direct and collaborative services and programs.

References

Charities based in Delaware
Foundations based in the United States
Foundation
Organizations established in 1991
1991 establishments in the United States